Excelsior University is a private online university in Albany, New York.  It offers undergraduate and graduate degrees and comprises three schools: the School of Undergraduate Studies, the School of Graduate Studies, and the School of Nursing. It serves mostly non-traditional, adult working students through their distance education programs.

History

Excelsior College was founded in 1971 by the New York State Board of Regents as its external degree program, known as The Regents External Degree Program (REX). The initial development of the program was funded by major grants from the Ford Foundation and the Carnegie Corporation. Known as Regents College from 1984 through 2000, it operated as a program of the Board of Regents (which also served as its board of trustees). In April 1998, the Board of Regents granted the school an absolute charter to operate as a private, nonprofit, independent institution. On January 1, 2001, Regents College, required to change its name under the terms of the separation, became Excelsior College (Excelsior means "ever upwards" in Latin; it is also the motto of the State of New York).

Excelsior College changed its name to "Excelsior University" on August 1, 2022.

Academics

History (Regents College)
Excelsior, originally Regents External Degrees and later Regents College because it was directly administered by the New York State Board of Regents, was from its inception a college that had faculty, majors, academic requirements, and advisors, but no courses. It provided a framework for evaluating and assembling academic credits into a degree program. In some cases a degree was awarded almost immediately after application, if the student had already met all degree requirements. For students needing additional academic credits, Excelsior provided some through its Excelsior College Examinations. For other subjects, through human advisors and online tools Excelsior referred students to regionally-accredited colleges which provided the needed instruction, accessible from the student's location whenever possible.

This was done with sufficient rigor that Excelsior had no difficulty in obtaining accreditation. However, Excelsior students did not qualify for Federal Student Aid, which funded instruction, not the advising and evaluation Excelsior provided. Starting with its first graduate program, a Master of Arts in Liberal Studies that began in 1998, Excelsior began adding courses, delivered at a distance through various modalities, such as DVDs.

Since Excelsior was designed to consolidate credit from other universities, any transfer credit from an accredited institution is accepted, if the course falls within one of Excelsior's degree programs and the credit is within an allowed time limit.

Since 1998
Excelsior is well known for its flexible, online degree programs.

Sources of college credit that can be used towards an Excelsior degree program, and to which advisors will refer an Excelsior student, include Excelsior distance learning courses, courses from other accredited institutions, college-level subject-matter examinations (including CLEP exams, and DSST/DANTES exams), non-collegiate training (including corporate, governmental, and military training) that has been evaluated for college-level credit by the American Council on Education (ACE) and National College Credit Recommendation Service (NCCRS), and assessments of prior learning portfolios. Unlike most colleges, Excelsior sets minimal limitations on the amount of allowable transfer credit.

Excelsior is a member of the Servicemembers Opportunity Colleges (SOC) Consortium of the American Association of State Colleges and Universities. SOC institutions are dedicated to helping servicemembers and their families earn college degrees. Military students can take courses in their off-duty hours at or near military installations in the United States, overseas, and on navy ships.  Additionally, Excelsior College has repeatedly been nominated as a top military-friendly school by multiple organizations.

Excelsior is one of several accredited colleges operating on a model similar to Thomas Edison State University in New Jersey and Charter Oak State College in Connecticut.

Accreditation
Excelsior University is regionally accredited by the Middle States Commission on Higher Education. Its bachelor's and master's nursing programs are accredited by the Accreditation Commission for Education in Nursing, Inc. (ACEN). The School of Nursing has twice been designated a Center of Excellence in Nursing Education by the National League for Nursing. Its baccalaureate degree programs in electrical engineering technology, information technology, and nuclear engineering technology are accredited by the Technology Accreditation Commission of ABET, Inc.The bachelor's and master's degree programs in business are accredited by the International Assembly for Collegiate Business Education (IACBE).

Notable alumni

 Deborah A. Ashenhurst (Class of 1994), adjutant general of the Ohio National Guard (2011-2015), appointed Director of the Ohio Department of Veterans Services in 2019
 Edward D. Baca (Class of 1986), Chief of the National Guard Bureau from 1994 to 1998
 Charles W. Bowen (Class of 2002), 10th Master Chief Petty Officer of the Coast Guard, 2006–2010
Benjamin Bryant (Class of 2006), Obama administration communications official, television producer, host of The Brink with Benjamin Bryant television specials and podcast
 Joe R. Campa Jr., 11th Master Chief Petty Officer of the Navy, 2006–2008
 Stacey Campfield, former Republican member of the Tennessee Senate from the 7th district.
 Daniel A. Dailey (Class of 2011), 15th Sergeant Major of the Army
 John R. D'Araujo Jr. (Class of 1987), Director of the Army National Guard from 1993 to 1995
Carl Hausman (Class of 1985), Professor of Journalism at Rowan University and author of Lies We Live By.
 Gilbert King (Class of 1985), winner of the 2013 Pulitzer Prize in non-fiction for Devil in the Grove: Thurgood Marshall, the Groveland Boys, and the Dawn of the New America.
 Judd Matheny (Class of 2000), member of the Tennessee House of Representatives from the 47th District.
 Anthony Munroe (Class of 1996), President of Essex County College
 Malcolm Nance (Class of 2011), author, scholar, and media commentator on international terrorism, intelligence, insurgency, and torture
 Anthony J. O'Donnell (Class of 1985), Maryland politician
 Richard Pope (Class of 1985), attorney and political candidate in the state of Washington
  Joseph J. Taluto (Class of 1986), retired Adjutant General of the New York National Guard
 Jason M. Vanderhaden (Class of 2015), 13th Master Chief Petty Officer of the Coast Guard
 John E. Walsh (Class of 1990), adjutant general of Montana, Lieutenant Governor of Montana (2013-2014), United States Senator from Montana (2014–2015)

See also

 Excelsior College Examinations

References

External links

Private universities and colleges in New York (state)
Universities and colleges in Albany County, New York
Distance education institutions based in the United States
Educational institutions established in 1971
Education in Albany, New York
1971 establishments in New York (state)
Organizations based in Albany, New York